Set Up is a 2005 Hong Kong horror film produced and written by Wong Jing, directed by Billy Chung and starring Christy Chung, Michael Tse and Roy Cheung.

Plot
Moon Siu is a horror story writer who got refractive surgery the day before her wedding. That night she stays at an unfurnished house in the suburb with her sister Yan. When Moon was sleeping, three robbers Pau, Kei and Man, who were hiding out there, kill Yan and her boyfriend and stuff her corpse in the refrigerator. Later Moon finds Yan's corpse and arrests Kei when her fiancé Ted arrives. Unknown to Moon, Ted actually belongs to the same gang as the robbers.

Cast
Christy Chung as Moon Siu
Michael Tse as Ted
Roy Cheung as Pau
Tony Ho as Kei
Winnie Leung as Yan
Johnny Lu as Edmund
Marco Lok as Man
Alan Ng as Red Ox
Pang Mei Seung as provision store boss

External links

Set Up at Hong Kong Cinemagic

2005 films
2005 horror films
2000s crime thriller films
2005 action thriller films
Hong Kong horror films
2000s Cantonese-language films
China Star Entertainment Group films
Films set in Hong Kong
Films shot in Hong Kong
2000s Hong Kong films